Altmar is an unincorporated community in Eagle Township, LaSalle County, Illinois, United States.

The community may be named after Altmar, New York.

References

Unincorporated communities in LaSalle County, Illinois
Unincorporated communities in Illinois